Jørn Inge Tunsberg (born 4 December 1970 in Bergen, Norway) is a death/black metal musician. He lives in Bergen and plays guitar in the black metal band Hades Almighty and the industrial metal band Dominanz.

Tunsberg played in the bands Old Funeral, Amputation and Immortal. He "got kicked out of the band" Immortal after the second demo, Northern Upins Death, was recorded in summer 1991. He then formed his own band, Hades, which is now known as Hades Almighty.

He was convicted for an arson attack on the Old Åsane Church on Christmas Eve 1992 along with Varg Vikernes and spent two years in prison. He gave interviews in Satan Rides the Media (a documentary focused on Varg Vikernes and the whole early Norwegian black metal scene) and Metal: A Headbanger's Journey. Tunsberg says in both these documentaries, and also in an interview with Bergensavisen, that he regrets nothing. In the 1990s, in Satan Rides the Media, Tunsberg stated that the action was a response to Christian morals and that "Norway should not be Christian", the point being "very symbolic". When Sam Dunn interviewed Tunsberg for his 2005 documentary Metal: A Headbanger's Journey, he replied that: "The most important thing that happened was that the church were burnt up. So that's something I stand for, and I stood for it then, I will stand for it now and I will stand for it until I die. […] It's kind of a statement, to break down Christianity."

References

1970 births
Living people
Norwegian guitarists
Norwegian male guitarists
Black metal musicians
Critics of Christianity
20th-century Norwegian criminals
Norwegian male criminals
Norwegian arsonists
People convicted of arson
Immortal (band) members
Old Funeral members
21st-century Norwegian guitarists
21st-century Norwegian male musicians
Anti-Christian sentiment in Europe